Erebia theano is a  butterfly found in the  East Palearctic that belongs to the browns family.

Subspecies
E. t. theano
E. t. approximata   Warren, 1930  Altai
E. t. tshugunovi   Korshunov & Ivonin, 1995 West Siberia
E. t. shoria   Korshunov & Ivonin, 1995 Kuznetsky Alatau

Biology
The larva feeds on Poaceae.

See also
List of butterflies of Russia

References

External links
 Images representing Erebia theano at Barcodes of Life
SZMN images

Satyrinae